Skynet.Aero is a regional airline based at the Krasnoyarsk Airport. The airline makes regular flights to Norilsk, Abakan, Novosibirsk, Irkutsk, Khabarovsk, Petropavlovsk-Kamchatsky, Magadan and Anadyr. In April 2011 it opened flights from Norilsk to Ufa and Kazan.

History 
Skynet Airline was founded in April 2010, as rebranded Krasnoyarsk transport company, which has been known since 2006 as an operator of charter flights, flying Ilyushin Il-76, Antonov An-74 and Yakovlev Yak-42D within Russia and abroad.

Destinations 
During the 2011 summer season Skynet was flying to the following destinations:
 Abakan
 Chita
 Irkutsk
 Kazan
 Khabarovsk
 Krasnoyarsk
 Magadan
 Norilsk
 Novosibirsk
 Petropavlovsk-Kamchatsky
 Ufa

Fleet 

As of April 15, 2011, Skynet operates the following aircraft types:

References

External links 

Skynet Airlines 

Airlines established in 2008
Defunct airlines of Russia
Companies based in Krasnoyarsk